The Škoda 30.5 cm Mörser M.11 is a siege howitzer produced by Škoda Works and used by the Austro-Hungarian Army during World War I and by Nazi Germany in World War II.

Development
Development began in 1906, when a development contract was placed by the Austro-Hungarian high command with Skoda-Werke in Pilsen to develop a weapon capable of penetrating the concrete fortresses being built in Belgium and Italy. Development work continued until 1909, when the first prototype was finished and, in 1910, fired secretly in Hungary.

There were a few technical problems with the first piece, but, after few reconstructions in 1911, the upgraded piece made another round of testing in Felixdorf and in the mountains of Tyrol. After that, Moritz von Auffenberg, the Minister of War, placed an order for 24 of the new weapons.

Description
The weapon was transported in three sections by a 100-horsepower 15 ton Austro-Daimler M 12 artillery tractor. It broke down into barrel, carriage and firing platform loads, each of which had its own trailer. It could be assembled and readied to fire in around 50 minutes.

The mortar could fire two types of shell, a heavy armour-piercing shell with a delayed action fuse weighing 384 kg, and a lighter 287 kg shell fitted with an impact fuze.

The weapon required a crew of 15–17, and could fire 10 to 12 rounds an hour. After firing, it automatically returned to the horizontal loading position.

In 1916, the M.11 design was upgraded and the new M.11/16 was produced - the difference was mainly that the firing platform had been modified to allow for a traverse of 360 degrees. Also in 1916, a new model was released, the M.16, which had longer barrel (L/12) and longer range .

History
Eight Mörsers were loaned to the German Army and they were first fired in action on the Western Front at the start of World War I. They were used in concert with the Krupp 42 cm howitzer ("Big Bertha") to destroy the rings of Belgian fortresses around Liege (Battle of Liège), Namur (Fortified Position of Namur) and Antwerp (Forts Koningshooikt, Kessel and Broechem). While the weapon was used on the Eastern, Italian and Serbian fronts until the end of the war, it was only used on the Western front at the beginning of the war.

In 1915, ten howitzers were used in support of the Austro-Hungarian-German invasion of Serbia under the German General August von Mackensen. One of these is restored in Belgrade Military Museum. By the end of the war, 79 of the weapons of all three types were in service. Only 24 were destroyed.

In the period between the world wars, large numbers of mortars were in service in Yugoslavia (4 M.11 and 6 M.16), Romania, Italy (23 M.11, 16 M.11/16 and 16 M.16), Czechoslovakia (17 M.16) and Hungary (3 M.11 and 2 M.16). There were only two in Austria; one in the Arsenal army museum in Vienna, the second as a training weapon in Innsbruck.

In 1939, Germany seized all 17 pieces from Czechoslovakia and repaired the howitzer from the Arsenal Museum, designating them 30.5 cm Mörser (t). In 1941, they obtained five more weapons after the defeat of Yugoslavia and placed them into service as the 30.5 cm Mörser 638(j). They saw service against Poland, France and the Soviet Union in World War II, where they served with Heavy Artillery Battalions (schwere Artillerie-Abteilungen) 624, 641 and 815 as well as two Heavy Static Artillery Batteries (schwere Artillerie-Batterie bodenstandig) 230 and 779.

The 624th, 641st and 815th Battalions took part in the Siege of Sevastopol (1941–42).

It is unclear if the howitzers of the Romanian Army were employed on the Eastern Front and used against the Red Army. At least one M.11 was seized from Yugoslavia and saw coastal defense service in the Adriatic as the 30.5 cm Mörser 639(j). It may have been upgraded somehow, as its Yugoslav designation was the 305 mm M 11/30. The Hungarian Army's five guns served in the 101. and 102. artillery groups from 1938 and were used against the Yugoslavians and the USSR.

Today, four weapons survive; an M.11 is in Rovereto, Italy (Museo Storico Italiano della Guerra), a second is displayed in Belgrade's Military Museum and a third is in Bucharest National Military Museum, Romania, along with the only surviving M.16.

Gallery

See also

Weapons of comparable role, performance and era
 BL 12 inch Howitzer British equivalent
 305 mm howitzer M1915 Russian equivalent

Notes

References 
 
 

 
 Kovács Vilmos: A Magyar Királyi Honvédség nehéztüzérsége. Haditechnika, 1995, Április-Június.  (photos and Hungarian text)

External links

 WW1 Southern Front Artillery and Fortification History
 Hungarian field artillery
 Heeres Independent Artillery Units of WW II on Panzerkeil
 The Austrian 30.5 Centimeter Field Mortar Field Artillery Journal: Volume IV, Number 4. October–December 1914
 Skoda mortar M11, M11/16, M16 (text and photos, Czech only)
 Skoda 305 mm Model 1911
 WW1 Surviving guns database

World War I howitzers
305 mm artillery
World War I artillery of Austria-Hungary
Siege artillery